Quzi, also spelled as qoozi or ghoozi, is a rice-based dish popular and is considered as one of Iraq's national dishes. It is served with very slowly cooked lamb, roasted nuts, and raisins served over rice. The dish was introduced into Turkey by Syrian immigrants. The dish can also be found in some Arab states of the Persian Gulf.

Etymology  
The Arabic word quzi قوزي comes from Ottoman Turkish kuzı قوزی meaning 'lamb'.

Variations  
In Iraqi cuisine, it is usually prepared by stuffing a whole lamb with rice, vegetables, spices and nuts and slow-cooking it over a closed or submerged oven. In some places in the Middle East it is buried in a pit containing burning coal or charcoal to get the smoky flavor.

There are many variations to this technique such as in Saudi Arabia and Yemen, where it is called madfoon, cooked by being wrapped in aluminium foil and kept on an open heat source. In Oman and UAE it is called shuwaa and is traditionally eaten on festive occasions, prepared by wrapping the marinated meat in date palm leaves and placing the wrapped meat in a submerged oven. In Jordan, and Syria it is known as zarb; the meat is portioned into smaller pieces and kept along with vegetables and bread dough so that the flavors are enhanced. Another variant is called haneeth where it is cooked inside a hot tabun; this variation can be found in most Middle Eastern countries as well as the Horn of Africa and North Africa.

See also

 Mesopotamian cuisine
 Arab cuisine
 Levantine cuisine
 List of lamb dishes
 List of rice dishes

References

Iraqi cuisine
Emirati cuisine
Jordanian cuisine
Lamb dishes
Levantine cuisine
Omani cuisine
Rice dishes
Saudi Arabian cuisine
Syrian cuisine
Turkish cuisine
Yemeni cuisine